Bertil Näslund (4 April 1933 –15 February 2016) was a Swedish economist and emeritus professor at Handelshögskolan i Stockholm (Stockholm School of Economics). Näslund earned his PhD from Carnegie Mellon University where he was awarded the Alexander Henderson Award. His doctoral advisor was William W. Cooper. He was made a member of the Royal Swedish Academy of Engineering Sciences in 1977, of the Royal Swedish Academy of Sciences in 1990, and was a member of the Committee for the Nobel Memorial Prize in Economic Sciences.

See also
 Chance-constrained portfolio selection

References

External links
Prof. Näslund's homepage at HHS

1933 births
2016 deaths
Swedish economists
Swedish business theorists
Academic staff of the Stockholm School of Economics
Members of the Royal Swedish Academy of Engineering Sciences
Members of the Royal Swedish Academy of Sciences
Stockholm School of Economics alumni